Santana Chakma; (32 years) is an Indian Politician from Tripura. She is Minister of Social Welfare and Social Education and Animal Resource Development  in Biplab Kumar Deb ministry. She became the MLA from Pencharthal Constituency by defeating CPI(M) Candidate  Anil Chakma by a margin of 1,373 votes.

References 

Year of birth missing (living people)
Chakma people
Indian Buddhists
Living people
Tripura politicians
Bharatiya Janata Party politicians from Tripura
Tripura MLAs 2018–2023